The 2014–15 Windsor Express season was the third season of the franchise in the National Basketball League of Canada. The Express finished the season with a 21–11 record and won the 2015 Finals in a controversial manner, with the opposing Halifax Rainmen forfeiting Game 7 after a pre-game brawl. They won their second consecutive title, becoming the second team to do so after the London Lightning under Micheal Ray Richardson. Head coach Bill Jones also won back-to-back titles.

Draft

Roster

References 

Windsor Express seasons
2014–15 NBL Canada season
NBL Canada championship seasons
Windsor